The Whitechapel and Bow Railway was an underground railway in east London, United Kingdom, now entirely integrated into the London Underground system. It was a joint venture between the Metropolitan District Railway and the London, Tilbury and Southend Railway.

History

Joint owners
From 1902 to 1950 it was owned and operated as a joint venture. Initially the arrangement was between the Metropolitan District Railway (commonly called the District Railway) and the London, Tilbury and Southend Railway. Both companies went through a series of amalgamations. The London, Tilbury and Southend Railway was purchased by the Midland Railway in 1912. It was subsequently grouped into the London, Midland and Scottish Railway in 1923 and was nationalised in 1948 as part of British Railways. The District Railway was part of the Underground Electric Railways Company of London and was absorbed into the London Passenger Transport Board in 1933. This was nationalised as the London Transport Executive in 1948. Complete ownership of the Whitechapel and Bow Railway passed to the London Transport Executive in 1950.

Construction
The two mile long line opened in 1902 and linked the Metropolitan District Railway at Whitechapel (St Mary's) with the London, Tilbury and Southend Railway at the above-ground Campbell Road Junction at Bow, to the west of Bromley station. The line from Whitechapel to Bow, and on to East Ham, was electrified in 1905. Regular services were provided by the District Railway with joint stock. A through Ealing Broadway to Southend service was also provided from 1910 to 1939, traction west of Barking being provided by District Railway's electric locomotives. The LMS extended electrified track east from Barking and electric District Railway trains reached Upminster in 1932.

List of stations
Whitechapel (current District line platforms)
Stepney Green
Mile End
Bow Road

Current operations
Today the short line forms part of the District line and Hammersmith & City line, between Whitechapel and Bow Road stations.

References

Transport in the London Borough of Tower Hamlets
Predecessor companies of the London Underground
History of rail transport in London
Railway lines opened in 1902